Jerzy Stefan Stawiński (1 July 1921 – 12 June 2010) was a Polish screenwriter and film director. Beginning in 1957 he had written or co-written 29 films. He wrote a segment of the film Love at Twenty, which was entered into the 12th Berlin International Film Festival.

He grew up in the Żoliborz district of Warsaw. When World War II broke out, Stawiński fought in the Polish Army. In 1940 he joined the partisans and in 1944 he fought in the Warsaw Uprising. He was eventually incarcerated in Oflag VII-A Murnau. After being liberated Stawiński volunteered for the Polish Army in the West and served in Italy in II Corps of Gen. Władysław Anders. He returned to Poland in 1947.

Selected filmography
 Man on the Tracks (1956)
 Kanał (1957)
 Heroism (1958)
 Bad Luck (1960)
 Love at Twenty (1962)
 Andremo in città (1966)
 Jutro idziemy do kina (2007)

Honours and awards
2010: Eagle Polish Film Award for Lifetime Achievement
2006: Gold medal Gloria Artis
2005: Honorary Award of the Pen Master for lifetime achievement at the Summer Film in Torun
1981: Cultural Activist of Merit Badge
1979 Golden Grape Award on Nov LLF in Lagow scenopisarski for their creative contributions to the achievements of Polish film school
1979: Prize of the City of Warsaw
1977: Award of the Ministry of Culture and Art
1975: Commander's Cross of the Order of Polonia Restituta
1963: Officer's Cross of the Order of Polonia Restituta
1959: Knight's Cross of the Order of Polonia Restituta
1943: Bronze Cross of Merit with Swords
1939: Cross of Valour

References

External links
 

1921 births
2010 deaths
Polish screenwriters
Polish film directors
Polish military personnel of World War II
Polish male writers
Recipients of the Gold Medal for Merit to Culture – Gloria Artis
Commanders of the Order of Polonia Restituta
German-language film directors
Recipients of the Cross of Merit with Swords (Poland)
Recipients of the Cross of Valour (Poland)
Warsaw Uprising insurgents
Home Army members
University of Warsaw alumni
People from Otwock County
Recipient of the Meritorious Activist of Culture badge